Nilaja Sun (born Nilaja Sun Gordon) is an actress, playwright, and a teaching artist from the Lower East Side in New York City. Sun has taught theatre in New York City public schools since 1998 and is best known for her award-winning one-person play, No Child... She is half Puerto Rican and half African-American.

Career

Sun has featured in TV shows and movies, including The Bourne Legacy (2012), Law & Order: Special Victims Unit (2004–2006), and 30 Rock (2008–2012).

Her most famous work, No Child..., follows the story of Miss Sun, a visiting teacher in a 10th grade classroom at Malcolm X High School in the Bronx. The one-person play includes 16 characters, a mixture of students, teachers, and administration. The play was created by Sun based on her eight-year experience with arts education in New York City schools, including at Martin Luther King Jr. High School. The story is narrated by the school's longtime janitor and follows the character's ups and downs as Miss Sun directs them in the performance of Timberlake Wertenbaker's 1988 play Our Country's Good, which in turn tells an 18th-century story of a British lieutenant directing a group of Australian convicts in the production of George Farquhar's 1706 comedy The Recruiting Officer. Through the play, Sun wants to shows how the school system is breaking and ultimately hopes to capture the life and love that exists in schools. No Child... is filled with humor, but representative of the experiences of children and teachers in under-resourced public schools across the United States. As of 2012, Sun has performed No Child... 700 times worldwide.

The play's title alludes to President George W. Bush's No Child Left Behind Act. Sun has stated that the show is not a direct indictment on the act, but a spotlight on great teachers. Sun chose this title in hopes that the audience would make a connection to education and able finish the phrase No Child... with what the play meant to them.

No Child... was funded by a grant from the New York State Council on the Arts and from a commission by the Epic Theatre Ensemble, formerly known as Epic Theater Center. Sun has worked closely with the ensemble for five years and produced nearly 20 of Epic's “Journeys” Programs and participated in Epic's Off-Broadway productions of Einstein's Gift, Pieces of the Throne and Time and the Conways. Through Epic's “Journeys” Programs Epic artists work closely with students in English, History, and Economics classrooms to analyze a play, rewrite their own version, and perform it alongside professional actors. Sun also teaches writing workshops at New York City's Rikers Island jail complex.

Sun was featured in the American Theatre Wing's Working in the Theatre series on solo performance in 2017.

Awards and honors
Sun's work has garnered critical acclaim and a total of 21 awards, including the Obie Award, the Lucille Lortel Award, and the soloNOVA Award for Artist of the Year by terraNOVA Collective. Sun's play “No Child...” was also named the Best One-Person Show at the U.S. Comedy Arts Festival in Aspen and received two Outer Critics Circle Awards for Outstanding Solo Performance and for Outstanding New American Play.

Other awards include:

 Princess Grace Award
 Theatre World Award
 Helen Hayes Award
 two NAACP Theatre Awards

Filmography

References

External links

 
 
 Nilaja Sun at Internet Off-Broadway Database

Year of birth missing (living people)
Living people
American television actresses
American film actresses
Hispanic and Latino American dramatists and playwrights
Theatre World Award winners
21st-century American women